The 2005 Betta Electrical 500 was the ninth round of the 2005 V8 Supercar Championship Series. It was held on the weekend of the 9 to 11 September at Sandown Raceway in Victoria.

It was the 38th "Sandown 500" endurance race.

Top ten shootout

Race results

Statistics
 Provisional pole position - #1 Marcos Ambrose - 1:10.6715
 Pole Position - #16 Garth Tander - 1:10.8917
 Fastest Lap - #888 Craig Lowndes - 1:11.7940
 Average Speed - 142 km/h

References

External links
 Official race results at www.natsoft.com.au 
 2005 Betta Electrical 500 from the Official V8 Supercar website - www.v8supercar.com.au via web.archive.org
 Images from the 2005 Betta Electrical Sandown 500 Retrieved from www.v8fans.com on 19 December 2008

Motorsport at Sandown
Betta Electrical 500
Pre-Bathurst 500